Shane McAnally (born October 12, 1974) is an American country music singer, songwriter, and record producer. Originally a solo artist for Curb Records in 1999, McAnally charted three singles on Hot Country Songs, including the No. 31 "Are Your Eyes Still Blue". McAnally left the country music business in 2000 and returned in 2006 as a songwriter, having initial success on that front with "Last Call" by Lee Ann Womack. He began working as a producer in 2013 with Kacey Musgraves' debut album Same Trailer Different Park. From the early 2010s onward, McAnally has worked almost exclusively as a songwriter and producer.

Musical career

Shane McAnally was born October 12, 1974, in Mineral Wells, Texas. He began performing at local clubs at the age of 12 and appeared on Star Search when he was 14, singing Dan Hill's "Sometimes When We Touch." He moved to Branson, Missouri at 15, then to Nashville at 19.

McAnally and music producer Rich Herring recorded a demo of a song that McAnally had written. The song, "Just One Touch", earned McAnally a publishing deal as well as a recording contract with Curb Records. In 1999, McAnally signed with Curb and began recording his first album for the label as well as his first single. "Say Anything" was released in 1999 as his debut single. The song peaked at No. 41 on the US Billboard Hot Country Songs chart. The follow-up single, "Are Your Eyes Still Blue", became his first top 40 single, peaking at No. 31. McAnally charted a third and final time with "Run Away", which reached No. 50. All three tracks appeared on a self-titled debut album released on Curb in 2000 before he left the label.

Songwriting

In 2001, McAnally moved to Los Angeles. He composed six songs for the soundtrack of 2007 independent film Shelter, credited as Shane Mack.

Returning to Nashville in late 2007, McAnally began writing songs for other artists, starting with "Last Call", released by Lee Ann Womack in 2008. From this point onward, McAnally has been primarily known for his songwriting work. He has also worked as a record producer, for artists such as Kacey Musgraves, Old Dominion, and Midland.

He has written and produced songs for Walker Hayes, Kacey Musgraves, Kelly Clarkson, Sam Hunt, Kenny Chesney, Reba McEntire, Jake Owen, Luke Bryan, The Band Perry, Lady A, Keith Urban, Thomas Rhett, Brothers Osborne, Old Dominion, Dierks Bentley, Miranda Lambert, Kelsea Ballerini, Midland, and more. The Academy of Country Music named him Songwriter of the Year in 2014. He also won "Best Country Album" and "Best Country Song" at the 2014 Grammy Awards for his work on Kacey Musgraves's Same Trailer Different Park. In 2015, Billboard named him the Hot Country Songwriter of the Year as well as a Billboard Power Player. McAnally joined industry veteran Jason Owen in early 2017 to relaunch Monument Records as co-presidents. McAnally stars as one of the on-screen talent producers in the NBC television reality series Songland. In 2019, McAnally won the ACM Award for Songwriter of the Year and Grammy Award for Best Country Song for co-writing Kacey Musgraves's "Space Cowboy." Most recently, he was named as one of Billboard's 2020 Country Power Players and chosen as the recipient of the 2020 Billboard Trailblazer Award, held only by previous winners Reba McEntire and Florida Georgia Line.

Personal life
McAnally told Yahoo! Entertainment in 2020 that he struggled with his sexuality for many years while working in Nashville, as he knew that no country music singers were openly gay at the time. At the time, he was dating a woman to whom he later came out, although he kept his orientation hidden from others and later referred to his girlfriend as a beard. After exiting Curb in 2000, McAnally decided to come out while living in West Hollywood, California, a city he knew was more accepting of the gay community. He worked songwriter shows there and chose to return to Nashville due to his enjoyment of music. McAnally received attention as a gay musician in 2013 when he co-wrote and co-produced "Follow Your Arrow" by Kacey Musgraves, a song which features a lyric in support of the gay community.

McAnally married his partner of five years, Michael Baum, in September 2012. The couple have two children.  In January 2017, the two were legally married by Nashville Mayor Megan Barry.

Discography and videography

Singles

Music videos

Producing discography
McAnally has produced or co-produced the following works:

Songland
McAnally is also a mentor on NBC's songwriting competition series, Songland.  On Songland, McAnally works alongside esteemed producers Ryan Tedder and Ester Dean, collaborating with unknown songwriters to craft hit songs. Each "winning" song is recorded by that episode's musical guest and released immediately following the episode. McAnally has described his role on the show as his "wildest dream job that I never knew I wanted." Songs co-written by McAnally as a part of his role on Songland are as follows.

Awards and nominations

References

External links
Shane McAnally - Official
Shane McAnally - Curb Artist
[ Shane McAnally - Overview]

1974 births
American country record producers
American country singer-songwriters
American male singer-songwriters
American LGBT singers
American LGBT songwriters
Place of birth missing (living people)
Gay singers
Gay songwriters
American gay musicians
Living people
Singer-songwriters from Texas
Curb Records artists
LGBT record producers
LGBT people from Texas
People from Mineral Wells, Texas
Musicians from Nashville, Tennessee
Country musicians from Texas
Country musicians from Tennessee
Record producers from Texas
21st-century American male singers
20th-century American LGBT people
21st-century American LGBT people
Singer-songwriters from Tennessee